Rafael Diego de Souza (born 8 July 1986), commonly known as Rafael, is a Brazilian footballer who plays as a defender.

Biography
Born in Porto Alegre, Rio Grande do Sul, Rafael was signed by RS Futebol in December 2004 along with his twin brother Cássio. They signed a 5-year contract. In March 2005 they were loaned to Juventude in 3-year contract. He played 23 games in 2005 and 2006 Campeonato Brasileiro Série A.

Avaí
In March 2007 Rafael joined Avaí until end of 2007 Campeonato Brasileiro Série B. In January 2008 he was signed permanently in 4-year contract. In his 3 years career with Avaí, he won 2009 and 2010 Campeonato Catarinense as well as finished as the third in 2008 Campeonato Brasileiro Série B and promoted. He played his 100 games for Avaí on 4 March 2010. The club gave him a special award to him.

In February 2011 he was signed by Swiss side Lugano. It was reported that he had been signed by Chunnam Dragons in June 2010 but the deal fell through.

Botev Plovdiv
On 16 June 2016 Rafael joined Botev Plovdiv. Due to an injury Rafael never took part in any official games.

Personal
Rafael played along with his twin brother Cássio from 2005 to 2008.

Honours
Avaí
 Campeonato Catarinense: 2009, 2010

Individual
 Best centre back Campeonato Catarinense: 2010

References

External links
 
 Swiss Football League Profile 
 Futpedia 

1986 births
Living people
Brazilian footballers
Campeonato Brasileiro Série A players
Esporte Clube Juventude players
Avaí FC players
FC Lugano players
Joinville Esporte Clube players
Al-Ittihad Kalba SC players
Botev Plovdiv players
Association football central defenders
Brazilian expatriate footballers
Expatriate footballers in Switzerland
Brazilian expatriate sportspeople in Switzerland
Expatriate footballers in Bulgaria
Brazilian expatriate sportspeople in Bulgaria
Footballers from Porto Alegre
UAE Pro League players